The El Palito oil spill was an oil spill that occurred at the El Palito refinery, Venezuela, in July 2020.

Oil spill 
The spill was estimated to be 25 thousand oil barrels into the Triste Gulf due to malfunctions in the cooler of the heat exchanger systems that use seawater to lower the pressure. In an attempt to double production from 20,000 to 40,000 daily oil barrels to 61,500 at the catalytic cracking and 87,500 bpd at the distillation tower, "multiple leaks" developed. The refinery had been unable to produce gasoline for several weeks. Experts argue that this was the tenth shutdown of the refinery in three months. The spill reached the eastern coast of Falcón State and Morrocoy National Park.

Aftermath 
Another spill occurred in February 2021.

See also 

 Environmental issues in Venezuela
 MV Wakashio oil spill
 Amuay tragedy
 Orinoco Mining Arc

References 

2020 disasters in Venezuela
2020 in Venezuela
Oil spills in South America
Environmental disasters in South America
PDVSA
Man-made disasters in Venezuela